Güliz Ayla (born 27 April 1988) is a Turkish singer and songwriter. She released her eponymous debut album in September 2015.

Life and career 
She attended the Samsun municipality conservatory for two years, studying theatre and drama. She graduated from Samsun Anadolu High School.

In 2006, she joined the Adelaide band. They became the winner of the Rock'n Dark Express Rock Music contest. She also sang in two of Müjdat Gezen's musicals.

She released her first single "Olmazsan Olmaz" in 2015. The song became the most searched song in Turkey on the music platform Shazam. Her eponymous debut album was released on 18 September 2015 with the help of Turkish singer Sıla Gençoğlu and composer Efe Bahadır. She promoted the album by launching the bahsetmemlazim.com (Turkish: I need to tell) website, where she responded to fan letters and tweets. "Bahsetmem Lazım", written by Christos Dantis and Ayla, became the first music video of the album.

Discography

Studio albums 
 Güliz Ayla (2015)
 Parla (2017)

Singles 
 "İlk Öpücük Benden Olsun" (2016)
 "Kimin Umrunda" (with Bahadır Tatlıöz) (2018)
 "Öldür Beni (Ufuk Kevser Remix)" (2019)
 "Öyle Sev" (2019)
 "Mıknatıs" (with Ege Çubukçu) (2019)
 "Öyle Sev (Acoustic)" (2019)
 "Sarmaşık" (2020)
 "Evdekilere Söyle" (2021)
 "Şivesi Sensin Aşkın" (2021)
 "Al Yorgun Kalbimi" (2022)

Music videos

References

External links 
 
 

1988 births
Turkish pop singers
Living people
21st-century Turkish singers
21st-century Turkish women singers
Turkish lyricists